SS Red Oak Victory  is a U.S. Victory ship of the  used in the Second World War.  She was preserved to serve as a museum ship in Richmond, California, and is managed by the Richmond Library of History and located near the Rosie the Riveter/World War II Home Front National Historical Park. She was one of 534 Victories built during World War II, but one of only a few of these ships to be transferred from the Merchant Marine to the United States Navy. She was named after Red Oak, Iowa, which suffered disproportionate casualties in early World War II battles. (Montgomery County ranked third among Iowa counties in World War II casualties per capita). The ship was active during World War II, the Korean War, and the Vietnam War.

History
Red Oak Victory was built by the Permanente Metals Corporation's Richmond Number 1 Yard in Richmond, California and launched on 9 November 1944. Victory ships were not intended to be long-lasting, but the welds of the Red Oak Victory remained intact after 76 years.

The ship was acquired by the United States Navy on December 5, 1944, and commissioned the same day as USS Red Oak Victory (AK-235). Following a fitting-out period, Red Oak Victory was loaded with cargo and departed San Francisco for Pearl Harbor on 10 January 1945. Red Oak Victory departed Hawaii on 10 February loaded with munitions needed in the Marshall and Caroline islands. Sent onward from Enewetak, she arrived in Ulithi on 28 February and then began operating under Commander Service Squadron Ten. Operating out of the Philippines, she issued cargo and ammunition to various fleet ships through the war's end in August 1945. During a hazardous tour of duty in the Pacific, Red Oak Victory handled many tons of ammunition, supplying the fleet without a single casualty.

Red Oak Victory was decommissioned in 1946 and returned to the U.S. Maritime Commission. Red Oak Victory was used by the Luckenbach Steamship Company from 1947 through the 1950s, when the vessel went to Japan, Korea, Cuba, Pakistan, India, Singapore, and Japan again. Red Oak Victory was operated by American Mail Lines for the Military Sea Transport Service from 1966 to 1968, making a dozen voyages to Vietnam, Japan, and the Philippines carrying military supplies loaded at West Coast ports. From 1968 until 1998, she was laid up in the National Defense Reserve Fleet in Suisun Bay.

Destined to be scrapped, Red Oak Victory came to the attention of the Richmond Museum Association in 1993. In 1996 Congress passed legislation authorizing the ship's conveyance to the Museum Association. Red Oak Victory was turned over to the Richmond Museum of History and towed to a new home in Richmond Shipyard 3 (near the location where Shipyard 1 was, where the ship was actually built in 1944) on 20 September 1998. She is being restored and operated by the Richmond Museum of History and is associated with the Rosie the Riveter/World War II Home Front National Historical Park.

See also
National Register of Historic Places listings in Contra Costa County, California

References

External links

 
 Red Oak Victory Historic Naval Ships Association
 

 

Victory ships
Boulder Victory-class cargo ships
Ships built in Richmond, California
1944 ships
Ammunition ships of the United States Navy
World War II auxiliary ships of the United States
Museum ships in California
Ships on the National Register of Historic Places in California
National Register of Historic Places in Richmond, California
Military and war museums in California
Museums in Contra Costa County, California
Naval museums in the United States
History of Contra Costa County, California
Tourist attractions in Richmond, California
Rosie the Riveter World War II Home Front National Historical Park
Historic American Engineering Record in California
World War II on the National Register of Historic Places in California
James River Reserve Fleet
Astoria Reserve Fleet
Suisun Bay Reserve Fleet